Flue-cured tobacco is a type of cigarette tobacco. Along with burley tobacco, it accounts for more than 90% of US tobacco production. Flue-cured farming is centered in North Carolina. Production was limited by national marketing quotas and acreage allotments. The crop was eligible for non-recourse price support loans until 2005, when the quota buyout program ended these programs (PL 108-357, Title VI).

See also
Tobacco#Curing
Types of tobacco

References

Tobacco in the United States